The men's 50 metre rifle from the prone position was a shooting sports event held as part of the Shooting at the 1912 Summer Olympics programme. It was the first appearance of the event. The competition was held on Thursday, 4 July 1912.

Forty-one sport shooters from nine nations competed.

Results

References

External links
 
 

Shooting at the 1912 Summer Olympics
Men's 050m prone 1912